National Highway 563 (NH 563) is a National Highway in India. Total length 248.83(154.62mi). It passes through the districts of  Jagtial, Karimnagar, Warangal and Khammam in Telangana state.

Route 
Jagtial - Karimnagar - Warangal - Khammam.

Junctions  
 
  Terminal near Jagtial.
  near Warangal.
  near Maripeda.
  Terminal near Khammam.

See also 
 List of National Highways in India
 List of National Highways in India by state

References

External links 
 NH 563 on OpenStreetMap

National highways in India
National Highways in Telangana